Prim is an unincorporated community in Cleburne County, Arkansas, United States. Prim has a post office with ZIP code 72130.

The community has the name of one Mr. Prim, a pioneer citizen.

Education 
Public education for elementary and secondary students is provided by West Side School District, which operates West Side Elementary School and West Side High School located in Greers Ferry. There is also a private school, Hilltop Holiness Academy. This is owned and operated by Hilltop Holiness Church.

References

Unincorporated communities in Cleburne County, Arkansas
Unincorporated communities in Arkansas